Frahm is a surname which may refer to:

 Art Frahm (1907-1981), American painter
 Dick Frahm (1906-1977), American football halfback
 Jan-Peter Frahm (1945-2014), German botanist
 Jasper Frahm (born 1996), German road and track cyclist
 Jens Frahm (born 1951), German biophysicist and physicochemist
 Joel Frahm (born 1970), American jazz saxophonist
 Leanne Frahm (born 1946), Australian writer of speculative fiction
 Matt Frahm (born 1990), American NASCAR driver
 Nicolai Frahm (born 1975), contemporary art advisor and collector
 Nils Frahm (born 1982), German musician
 Pernille Frahm (born 1954), Danish politician, teacher, and member of the Folketing
 Richie Frahm (born 1977), American former professional basketball player
 Sheila Frahm (born 1945), Republican senator representing Kansas
 W. Frahm, German mathematician

See also 

 Willy Brandt (1913-1992), West German politician born Herbert Frahm